This is a list of sports city derbies or other rivalries in Ukraine among professional teams. Those include games where rival teams met with each other more than one season.

Association football

Premier League
 Klasychne derby or National rivalry Dynamo Kyiv vs. Shakhtar Donetsk
 Main Donbas rivalry Shakhtar Donetsk vs. Zorya Luhansk
 Galicia – Volhynia (West Ukrainian) rivalry Karpaty Lviv vs. Volyn Lviv
 Main Kyiv derby (Capital derby) Dynamo vs. Arsenal (CSKA)
 Kyiv derby Dynamo vs. Obolon
 Kyiv derby Arsenal vs. Obolon
 Donetsk derby Shakhtar vs. Metalurh
 Zaporizhzhia derby Metalurh vs. Torpedo
 Lviv derby Karpaty vs. Lviv
 Kharkiv derby Metalist vs. Kharkiv
 Odesa derby Chornomorets vs. Odesa
 Donetsk (Donbas) rivalry Shakhtar vs. Olimpik, conducted outside of Donetsk due to Russian aggression

Regional derbies
 Volhynian rivalry Volyn Lutsk vs. Veres Rivne
 Podillian rivalry Nyva Vn. vs. Podillia Khmelnytskyi
 Carpathian rivalry Hoverla (Zakarpattia) vs. Prykarpattia Ivano-Frankivsk
 Carpathian (West Ukrainian) rivalry Hoverla (Zakarpattia) vs. Karpaty Lviv
 [Great] Galician derby Karpaty Lviv vs. Prykarpattia Ivano-Frankivsk
 West Ukrainian derby Rukh Vynnyky vs. Prykarpattia Ivano-Frankivsk
 West Ukrainian derby Volyn Lutsk vs. Prykarpattia Ivano-Frankivsk
 Dnipro–Kharkiv rivalry FC Dnipro vs. Metalist Kharkiv (SC Dnipro-1 vs. Metalist 1925)

AR Crimea
 Main Crimean rivalry Tavriya Simferopol vs. FC Sevastopol (Top level)
 Crimean rivalry FC Sevastopol vs. Krymteplytsia Molodizhne (by Football Federation of Ukraine and Professional Football League)

Donetsk Oblast
 Donetsk Oblast (Donbas) rivalry Shakhtar Donetsk vs. [Illichivets] Mariupol (Top level) (by Segodnya)
 Donetsk Oblast (Donbas) rivalry Metalurh Donetsk vs. [Illichivets] Mariupol (Top level) (by Football Federation of Ukraine)
 Donetsk Oblast rivalry Illichivets Mariupol vs. Shakhtar-2 Donetsk
 Donetsk Oblast rivalry Olimpik Donetsk vs. Avanhard Kramatorsk

Dnipropetrovsk Oblast
 Main Dnipropetrovsk Oblast rivalry FC Dnipro vs. Kryvbas Kryvyi Rih (Top level)
 Dnipropetrovsk Oblast rivalry Dnipro vs. Stal Dniprodzerzhynsk (Top level)
 Dnipropetrovsk Oblast rivalry Metalurh Nikopol vs. Shakhtar Pavlohrad

Luhansk Oblast
 Main Luhansk Oblast rivalry Zorya Luhansk vs. Stal Alchevsk (Top level)
 Luhansk Oblast rivalry Stal Alchevsk vs. Khimik Severodonetsk
 Luhansk Oblast rivalry Zorya Luhansk vs. Khimik Severodonetsk

Sumy Oblast
 Main Sumy Oblast rivalry Naftovyk Okhtyrka vs. [Yavir]–Sumy
 Sumy Oblast rivalry Naftovyk Okhtyrka vs. SBTS Sumy
 Sumy Oblast rivalry Naftovyk Okhtyrka vs. FC Sumy

Poltava Oblast
 Main Poltava Oblast rivalry Vorskla Poltava vs. Neftekhimik Kremenchuk
 Poltava Oblast rivalry FC Poltava vs. Hirnyk-Sport

Ivano-Frankivsk Oblast
 Main Ivano-Frankivsk Oblast rivalry Prykarpattia Ivano-Frankivsk vs. Enerhetyk Burshtyn
 Ivano-Frankivsk Oblast rivalry Spartak Ivano-Frankivsk vs. Enerhetyk Burshtyn

Kirovohrad Oblast
 Kirovohrad Oblast rivalry Zirka Kropyvnytskyi vs. [Polihraftekhnika] Oleksandriya (Top level)

Zakarpattia Oblast
 Zakarpattia Oblast rivalry Zakarpattia Uzhhorod vs. Pryladyst Mukacheve

Mykolaiv Oblast
 Mykolaiv Oblast rivalry Evis Mykolaiv vs. Artania Ochakiv

Khmelnytskyi Oblast
 Khmelnytskyi Oblast rivalry Podillya Khmelnytskyi vs. Temp [Ratusha]

Lviv Oblast
 Lviv Oblast rivalry Karpary Lviv vs. Hazovyk-Skala

City derbies (professional league games)

Kharkiv
 Kharkiv derby: Spartak – Silmash (1937–1939) - Soviet Top League (Group A) (1:4, 0:2, 1:5)
 Kharkiv derby: Spartak – Dynamo (1936, 1937, 1939) (1:1, 2:1, 1:5)
 Kharkiv derby: Dynamo – Silmash (1937, 1939, 1940) (1:2, 0:5, 3:1, 5:2)
 Kharkiv derby: Dynamo – Traktor (1937) (3:0)
 Kharkiv derby: Spartak – Traktor (1937) (3:0)
 Kharkiv derby: Silmash – Traktor (1937) (1:3)
 Kharkiv derby: Lokomotyv – Dzerzhynets (1947, 1948) (1:0, 5:3, 2:0, 8:1)
 Kharkiv derby: Torpedo – Dzerzhynets (1949) (0:1, 1:4)
 Kharkiv derby: Arsenal – Metalist-2 (1999/0–2001/2) (0:2, 0:0, 2:0, 4:1, 1:0, 0:6)
 Kharkiv derby: Arsenal – Metalist (2003/4) (1:2, 1:1)
 Kharkiv derby: Helios – Metalist-2 (2003/4, 2004/5) (1:1, 0:1, 4:1, 2:2)
 Main Kharkiv derby: Kharkiv – Metalist (2005/6–2008/9) (1:0, 0:1, 2:0, 0:0, 0:2, 0:2, 1:1, 1:2)
 Kharkiv derby: Arsenal – Kharkiv-2 (2005/6) (4:0, 2:1)
 Kharkiv derby: Helios – Kharkiv (2009/10) (5:0, 0:1)

Kyiv
 Kyiv derby: Dynamo – Lokomotyv (1938) – Soviet Top League (Group A) (1:1)
 Kyiv derby: DO – Spartak (1949) (2:2, 2:0)
 Kyiv derby: Arsenal – Temp/Oktiabrsky Raion (1960–1962) (0:0, 2:0, 2:1, 3:1, 2:0, 2:3)
 Kyiv derby: Arsenal – SKA (1963) (1:0, 0:2)
 Kyiv derby: Dynamo-2 – SKA/CSKA[-2] (1992, 1996/7–2007/8) (1:0, 2:0, 3:0, 1:1, 3:1, 2:0, 1:0, 1:1, 2:0, 0:1, 3:0, 1:3, 2:2, 0:2, 2:0, 2:2, 4:1, 4:1, 0:1, 0:2, 4:0, 0:0, 1:1, 0:0, 5:1, 3:2)
 Kyiv derby: Dynamo-2 – CSKA-Borysfen (1994/5) (4:0, 1:3)
 Main Kyiv derby: Dynamo – CSKA/Arsenal (1995/6–2013/14, 2018/19) (2:1, 0:0, 1:0, 2:2, 1:0, 4:0, 4:0, 2:0, 3:0, 3:1, 5:1, 1:0, 1:0, 2:0, 1:0, 3:1, 6:1, 3:0, 0:0, 1:1, 2:0, 3:1, 1:0, 5:2, 1:0, 2:2, 3:0, 2:0, 3:1, 1:0, 3:2, 3:0, 1:0, 2:0, 4:0, 1:0, 2:0, 4:0, 1:0)
 Kyiv derby: Obolon – CSKA[-2] (1995/6, 1999/0, 2001/2, 2005/6–2007/8) (0:0, 0:1, 2:1, 0:1, 3:1, 1:2, 2:1, 3:0, 3:2, 1:1, 1:1, 4:3)
 Kyiv derby: Dynamo-2 – Obolon (1999/0, 2001/2, 2005/6–2008/9, 2012/13, 2015/16) (4:1, 0:0, 1:2, 0:1, 1:3, 0:2, 2:0, 0:1, 1:0, 0:4, 1:0, 0:0, 2:1, +/-, 1:3, 0:2)
 Kyiv derby: Dynamo-3 – Obolon-2 (2001/2, 2003/4–2007/8) (3:2, 5:0, 1:2, 0:0, 3:1, 2:2, 1:1, 1:1, 3:0, 1:1, 2:1, 0:1)
 Kyiv derby: Dynamo – Obolon (2002/3–2004/5, 2009/10–2011/12) (1:1, 5:3, 4:0, 2:0, 7:0, 3:1, 4:0, 2:1, 2:2, 0:2, 4:0, 1:0)
 Kyiv derby: Arsenal – Obolon (2002/3–2004/5, 2009/10–2011/12, 2016/17, 2017/18) (2:0, 2:0, 2:1, 1:3, 1:0, 1:2, 4:1, 0:0, 1:0, 1:1, 4:1, 1:0, 2:1, 1:0, 1:1 , 5:1)
 Kyiv derby: Obolon-2 – CSKA (2008/9) (0:2, -/+)

Lviv
 Lviv derby: DO – Spartak (1949) (1:3, 1:2)
 Lviv derby: SKA – Karpaty (1965–1969) (2:0, 3:0, 1:0, 0:1, 0:0, 1:2, 1:5, 1:4, 1:1, 1:2)
 Lviv derby: Dynamo – Karpaty-3[2] (1999/0–2001/2) (1:3, 0:1, 1:0, 3:0, 1:0, 0:1)
 Lviv derby: Dynamo – SKA-Orbita (2001/2) (4:0, 0:0)
 Lviv derby: Karpaty-3 – SKA-Orbita (2001/2) (1:1, 0:0)
 Main Lviv derby: Karpaty – Lviv (2008/9, 2018/19, 2019/20) (2:1, 4:2, 0:1, 1:1, 0:0, 0:0, 1:1, 1:1)
 Lviv derby: Karpaty-2 – Lviv-2 (2009/10) (2:0, 1:3)
(* Lviv derby: Karpaty – Shakhtar Donetsk (2014/15, 2015/16) (0:2, 2:2, 1:2, 0:3))

Luhansk
 Luhansk derby: Trudovi Rezervy – Dynamo (1949) (4:1, 2:1)
 Luhansk derby: Zoria – Shakhtar (2002/3) (2:1, 0:0)

Odesa
 Main Odesa derby: SKVO/SKA – Chornomorets (1959, 1961, 1962, 1964–1966) – Soviet Top League (Class A, Group 1) (1:0, 0:1, 0:0, 1:2, 0:2, 0:1, 2:1, 1:1, 0:2, 0:1, 1:0, 0:2)
 Odesa derby: Odesa – SKA-Lotto (1997/8) (2:0, 0:2)
 Odesa derby: Dynamo – SKA-Lotto (1997/8) (1:2, 0:1)
 Odesa derby: Odesa – Dynamo[-SKA] (1997/8, 1998/9) (3:0, 1:0, 8:0, +/-)
 Odesa derby: Palmira – Chornomorets-2 (2003/4) (1:2, 2:1)
 Odesa derby: Palmira – Real (2004/5) (1:1, 2:1)
 Odesa derby: Real Pharma – Zhemchuzhyna (2016/17) (1:1, 0:2)
 Odesa derby: Real Pharma – Chornomorets-2 (2019/20) (0:0, 0:3)

Poltava
 Poltava derby: Kolhospnyk – Lokomotyv (1960, 1961) (5:3, 1:3, 2:1, 2:0, 5:2)

Rivne
 Rivne derby: Kolhospnyk – Spartak (1960–1962) (1:0, 3:1, 2:1, 1:1, 6:0, 3:0)

Chernivtsi
 Chernivtsi derby: Avanhard – Spartak (1960) (3:0, 5:0)
 Chernivtsi derby: Avanhard – Mashynobudivnyk (1961) (1:0, 4:0)

Chernihiv
 Chernihiv derby: Desna – Zirka (1961) (6:0, 5:0)

Mykolaiv
 Mykolaiv derby: Sudnobudivnyk – Torpedo (1961) (1:1, 2:0)
 Mykolaiv derby: Sudnobudivnyk – Vympel (1962) (6:1, 2:0)
 Mykolaiv derby: Sudnobudivnyk – Mykolaiv-2 (2017/18) (2:2, 1:4, 1:3)

Ternopil
 Ternopil derby: Avanhard – Motor (1960) (1:1, 5:1)
 Main Ternopil derby: Nyva – Ternopil (2012/13, 2014/15, 2015/16) (1:0, 2:0, 1:0, 1:1, 2:2, 2:2, 0:1, -/+)

Vinnytsia
 Vinnytsia derby: Lokomotyv – Burevisnyk (1962) (4:0, 0:0)

Sumy
 Sumy derby: Avanhard – SVADKU (1962) (2:0, 3:1)
 Sumy derby: Sumy – Frunzenets-Liha (2001/2) (2:1, 2:1)

Zaporizhzhia
 Main Zaporizhzhia derby: Torpedo – Metalurh (1992-1997/8) (3:0, 1:0, 1:1, 1:3, 3:1, 0:4, 1:0, 0:2, 0:2, 0:4, 1:0, 1:1)
 Zaporizhzhia derby: Viktor – Metalurh-2 (1999/0) (1:1, 0:0)
 Zaporizhzhia derby: Torpedo – Metalurh-2 (2002/3) (1:1, 0:2)
 Zaporizhzhia derby: Metalurh – Zoria Luhansk (2014/15, 2015/16) (0:1, 0:3, 0:6, 1:4)

Donetsk
 Donetsk derby: Shakhtar-2 – Metalurh (1995/6) (2:0, 0:3)
 Main Donetsk derby: Shakhtar – Metalurh (1997/8–2013/14) (2:0, 2:1, 4:0, 4:2, 2:0, 3:2, 3:1, 3:0, 1:0, 3:1, 3:1, 2:0, 3:1, 2:0, 3:1, 3:0, 3:1, 2:0, 2:1, 0:0, 4:1, 1:0, 2:1, 1:1, 4:1, 1:0, 2:0, 2:0, 2:0, 2:0, 4:0, 4:0, 2:1, 2:2)
 Donetsk derby: Shakhtar-2 – Metalurh-2 (1997/8) (1:0, 1:2)
 Donetsk derby: Shakhtar-3 – Metalurh-2 (2001/2–2003/4) (3:1, 1:2, 1:0, 2:1, 4:2, 1:0)
 Donetsk derby: Shakhtar-3 – Olimpik (2004/5–2010/11) (2:0, 0:2, 0:2, 1:5, 3:1, 1:1, 1:2, 2:3, 1:1, 2:6, 0:0, 1:4, 1:3, 1:3)
 Donetsk derby: Titan – Olimpik (2007/8, 2008/9) (1:1, 0:3, 1:1, 0:2)
 Donetsk derby: Shakhtar-3 – Titan (2007/8, 2008/9) (2:2, 2:1, 3:2, 5:1)

Kremenchuk
 Kremenchuk derby: Kremin – Adoms (1999/0) (0:2, 0:4)

Ivano-Frankivsk
 Ivano-Frankivsk derby: Fakel – Chornohora (2004/5, 2005/6) (3:2, 1:1, 2:1, 1:0)

Zhytomyr
 Zhytomyr derby: Zhytychi – Zhytomyr (2005/6) (0:0, +/-)

Kryvyi Rih
 Kryvyi Rih derby: Hirnyk – Kryvbas-2 (2005/6) (2:0, 1:1)

Bila Tserkva
 Bila Tserkva derby: Arsenal – Ros (2008/9) (2:2, 1:1)

Crimea
 Crimea derby: Tavriya – Sevastopol (2010/11) (2:1, 1:0)

Oleksandria
 Oleksandria derby: Oleksandria – UkrAhroKom (2013/14) (2:1, 2:2)

Dnipro
 Dnipro derby: Dnipro – Dnipro-1 (2017/18) (2:0, 0:0, 1:2)

References

External links
 Regional derbi: history and the present. Sport.if.ua. 13 August 2010
 SteveGOLD. New regional derby (Нове обласне дербі). UA-Football. 19 July 2015

 
Ukraine
Ukraine